Vedernikovsky is a rural locality (a village) in Podlesnensky Selsoviet, Sterlitamaksky District, Bashkortostan, Russia. The population was 3 as of 2010. There is 1 street.

Geography 
Vedernikovsky is located 28 km north of Sterlitamak (the district's administrative centre) by road. Chuvashsky Kuganak is the nearest rural locality.

References 

Rural localities in Sterlitamaksky District